Barry W. Roseborough (April 30, 1932 – March 14, 1992) was a Canadian football player who played for the Winnipeg Blue Bombers. He won the Grey Cup with them in 1958. He played college football at the University of North Dakota. After his CFL career, he coached the Saskatchewan Huskies football team at the University of Saskatchewan from 1960 to 1962. He also attended the University of Michigan and Western Michigan University, eventually getting a Ph.D. He died in a hospital in Michigan in 1992.

References

1932 births
1992 deaths
Players of Canadian football from Saskatchewan
Sportspeople from Saskatoon
Winnipeg Blue Bombers players